Giacomo Ferrari (born 22 January 2002) is an Italian rugby union player, currently playing for Italian United Rugby Championship side Zebre. His preferred position is flanker.

Ferrari signed for Zebre Parma in May 2022 ahead of the 2022–23 United Rugby Championship as Academy Player.

In 2021 and 2022 Ferrari was named in Italy U20s squad for annual Six Nations Under 20s Championship.
On 10 January 2023, he was named in Italy A squad for a uncapped test against Romania A.

References

External links
itsrugby.co.uk Profile

2002 births
Sportspeople from Rome
Zebre Parma players
Living people
Rugby union flankers
Italian rugby union players